The 1990 Swedish Golf Tour was the fifth season of the Swedish Golf Tour, a series of professional golf tournaments for women held in Sweden.

Tournament Directors were Rolf Ericsson, Claes Grönberg and Pia Nilsson. The player council consisted of Katrin Möllerstedt, Susann Norberg, Viveca Hoff and Liv Wollin. Tournaments were played over 54 holes with no cut, the SI and LET events over 72 holes with cuts.

Amateur Annika Sörenstam, Margareta Bjurö and Jennifer Allmark captured the most titles with two wins each, while Marie Wennersten-From won her first Order of Merit.

Schedule
The season consisted of 9 tournaments played between May and September, where one event was included on the 1990 Ladies European Tour.

Order of Merit
The sponsored name was the ICA-förlaget Order of Merit.

Source:

See also
1990 Swedish Golf Tour (men's tour)

References

External links
Official homepage of the Swedish Golf Tour

Swedish Golf Tour (women)
Swedish Golf Tour (women)